The 1947 Utah Redskins football team was an American football team that represented the University of Utah as a member of the Mountain States Conference (MSC) during the 1947 college football season. In their 23rd season under head coach Ike Armstrong, the Redskins compiled an overall record of 8–1–1 with a mark of 6–0 against conference opponents, winning the MSC title.

Schedule

After the season

NFL Draft
Utah had three players selected in the 1948 NFL Draft.

References

Utah
Utah Utes football seasons
Mountain States Conference football champion seasons
Utah Redskins football